The 2010–11 Santa Clara Broncos men's basketball team represented Santa Clara University during the 2010–11 NCAA Division I men's basketball season. The Broncos, led by fourth-year head coach Kerry Keating, played their home games at the Leavey Center and are members of the West Coast Conference. They finished the season 24–14, 8–6 in WCC play and lost in the semifinals of the 2011 West Coast Conference men's basketball tournament to Saint Mary's. They were invited to and were champions of the 2011 CollegeInsider.com Tournament.

Roster

Schedule
 
|-
!colspan=9 style=| Exhibition

|-
!colspan=9 style=| Regular season

|-
!colspan=9 style=| WCC tournament

|-
!colspan=9 style=| CollegeInsider.com tournament

References

Santa Clara
Santa Clara
Santa Clara Broncos men's basketball seasons
CollegeInsider.com Postseason Tournament championship seasons